The 24th season of Taniec z gwiazdami, the Polish edition of Dancing with the Stars, started on 6 March 2020 and stopped on 13 March 2020 to 4 September of that year due COVID-19 pandemic. This is the eleventh season aired on Polsat.

Couples

Scores

Red numbers indicate the lowest score for each week.
Green numbers indicate the highest score for each week.
 indicates the couple eliminated that week.
 indicates the returning couple that finished in the bottom two or three.
 indicates the couple saved from elimination by immunity.
 indicates the winning couple.
 indicates the runner-up.
 indicates the couple in third place.
 indicates the couple withdrew from the competition.

Average score chart 
This table only counts for dances scored on a 30-points scale.

Highest and lowest scoring performances 
The best and worst performances in each dance according to the judges' 30-point scale:

Couples' highest and lowest scoring dances

According to the 30-point scale:

Weekly scores
Unless indicated otherwise, individual judges scores in the charts below (given in parentheses) are listed in this order from left to right: Andrzej Grabowski, Iwona Pavlović and Michał Malitowski.

Week 1: Season Premiere

Running order

Week 2
On March 11, 2020, Polsat announced that for now they will be shooting show with no studio audience to protect the health and safety of the staff and crew.

At the end of the show, the hosts announced that the season would be halted due to the coronavirus pandemic.

Running order

Week 3

At the beginning of the show hosts announced that Marcin Bosak had withdrawn from the show due to a professional reasons. Moreover Tomasz Oświeciński's dance partner, Janja Lesar, had left the show due to private issues. She was replaced by Wiktoria Omyła.

Running order

Week 4: Personal Stories
As the voting results were being read out, Sylwester Wilk announced his decision to leave the competition due to health concerns.

Running order

Week 5: Polish Movies Week

Running order

Week 6: Wedding Party

Running order

Week 7: Family and Friends Dances 

Running order

Week 8: Trio Challenge
On October 9, 2020, Polsat announced that for now they will be shooting show with no studio audience to protect the health and safety of the staff and crew.

Bogdan Kalus and his partner Lenka Klimentova withdrew from the competition as they were quarantining. Due to quarantine Jan Kliment, Anna Karwan's partner, was replaced by Kamil Kuroczko. 

At the end of the show, the hosts announced that Sylwester Wilk and his partner Hanna Żudziewicz by decision of format owner will come back to the competition.

Running order

Week 9: Semifinal

Sylwia Lipka and Rafał Maserak withdrew from competition due to coronavirus infection.

Running order

Week 10: Season Final

Running order

Dance chart
The celebrities and professional partners danced one of these routines for each corresponding week:
Week 1 (Season Premiere): Cha-cha-cha, Tango, Waltz, Jive
Week 2: One unlearned dance (introducing Foxtrot, Quickstep, Samba, Viennese Waltz)
Week 3: One unlearned dance
Week 4 (Personal Stories): One unlearned dance (introducing Charleston, Contemporary, Rumba)
Week 5 (Polish Movies Week): One unlearned dance
Week 6 (Wedding Party): One unlearned dance (introducing Paso Doble) and dance improvisation
Week 7 (Family and Friends Dances): One unlearned dance and one repeated dance (introducing Salsa) Julia & Stefano: Two unlearned dances
Week 8 (Trio Challenge): One unlearned dance and one repeated dance
Week 9 (Semifinal): One unlearned dance and one repeated dance
Week 10 (Season Final): Judge's choice, Freestyle and couple's favourite dance of the season

 Highest scoring dance
 Lowest scoring dance
 Performed, but not scored
 Bonus points
 Not performed due to withdrawal
 Gained bonus points for winning this dance-off
 Gained no bonus points for losing this dance-off

Guest performances

Rating figures

References

External links
 

Season 24
2020 Polish television seasons